During the first year and more after the United States entered the war against the Axis powers, the United States Navy suffered from an acute shortage of warships, particularly of antisubmarine warfare and escort types. To fill that need, an extensive ship construction and acquisition program was inaugurated. Part of that program consisted of placing orders with British and Canadian firms already tooled up to produce . Vitality (PG-100) was such a ship. However, before she was launched on 15 April 1943 by the Midland Shipyard in Canada, she was traded to the Royal Navy under the terms of the lend-lease agreement for a similar ship being constructed in Canada. The British renamed her HMS Willowherb, and she served in the Royal Navy for the duration of the war. On 11 June 1946, she was returned to the custody of the United States Navy. Though carried on the Navy list as PG-100 following the war, Vitality never actively served the United States Navy. She remained idle until sold on 7 May 1947. To whom she was sold and for what purpose is unknown, but one source indicates that she was not scrapped until 1961.

References

External links
USS Vitality (PG-100)
Online: Gunboat Photo Archive - HMS Willowherb (K283) ex-Vitality (PG 100)

World War II naval ships of the United States
Ships built in Ontario
Action-class gunboats
1943 ships
Willowherb